"Sing, You Sinners" is a popular song with music by W. Franke Harling and lyrics by Sam Coslow. In 1930 it was used in the film Honey starring Lillian Roth. The Bing Crosby 1938 Paramount musical Sing You Sinners also included the song in the title credits.

Popular recordings in 1930 were by The High Hatters (on Victor 22322) and by Smith Ballew and his Orchestra. A good early recording is found on the album "The Song Hits of 1930 (Jazz Age Chronicles, Vol. 9)", and is sung by The Charleston Chasers. This is, perhaps, the way Coslow and Harling intended it to be performed. A version was released in 1930 by Hit of the Week Records, credited to Harlem Hot Chocolates but actually performed by Duke Ellington and his band. In Britain, the song was recorded by the duo Bob and Alf Pearson.

A popular version was recorded by Tony Bennett for Columbia Records (No. CO44125) on July 20, 1950. Bennett also recorded the song on several more occasions. In addition it is featured on Tony Bennett album Duets: An American Classic when he sings it with singer John Legend. In 1951 Margaret Whiting performed the song with orchestra directed by Frank DeVol (Capitol 1417 78rpm).

Rosemary Clooney included the song on her album Swing Around Rosie (1959).

The song is the title track of Erin McKeown's October 24, 2006 album Sing You Sinners.

Max Fleischer’s cartoon “Swing You Sinners!” (1930) from the Talkartoons series is entirely based on the modified version of this song, “Swing you Sinners”.

The song was used in the 1955 film I'll Cry Tomorrow when it was sung and danced by Susan Hayward and the chorus. It is also heard in a medley montage by Susan Hayward (vocal) and Eddie Albert (piano).

References

1930 songs
Tony Bennett songs
Songs written by Sam Coslow
Songs with music by W. Franke Harling
Belle Baker songs